The Language of Life is the fifth studio album by British musical duo Everything but the Girl. It was released on 5 February 1990 by Atlantic Records and Blanco y Negro Records.

The Language of Life became Everything but the Girl's second album to surpass sales of 500,000 copies, but the album divided the group's British fanbase. In 2012, group member Tracey Thorn described The Language of Life as "a slightly slick, kind of semi-jazzy, sophisticated record" and recalled that it "was a definite attempt to try and do something that had a character to it, but in retrospect when we were asked why we had taken that direction, we couldn't entirely say why".

Background
Producer Tommy LiPuma had previously worked with artists like Miles Davis, Horace Silver, Randy Newman, and George Benson, and had contributed production to Aztec Camera's 1987 album Love. He had expressed an interest in producing Everything but the Girl, and Tracey Thorn and Ben Watt, feeling that they had lost their place within the UK music scene, contacted him and asked him if he wanted to hear some demos. He invited them to New York City, and then to Los Angeles, where they would eventually record The Language of Life.

Tracey Thorn performed lead vocals on the album, and Ben Watt played guitar and piano, as well as doing some singing. Song arrangements were written by Larry Williams and Jerry Hey. The band LiPuma put together included Omar Hakim on drums, John Patitucci on bass and Larry Williams on keyboards. LiPuma produced, in Thorn's words, "a fully realised, immaculately performed and produced modern American soul-pop record".

The cover shot was by Nick Knight.

Track listing

Personnel
Everything but the Girl
Tracey Thorn – vocals
Ben Watt – guitar, piano, vocals
Additional musicians
John Patitucci – bass
Jerry Hey – flugelhorn (tracks 3, 10), horn arrangements
Larry Williams – piano, synthesisers
Kirk Whalum – tenor saxophone (tracks 4, 6, 7)
Russell Ferrante – piano (tracks 3, 6)
Lenny Castro – percussion
Michael Landau – guitar (tracks 2, 4, 6-9)
Omar Hakim – drums
Vinnie Colaiuta – drums (track 7)
Stan Getz – tenor saxophone (track 10)
Joe Sample – piano (track 5)
Michael Brecker – tenor saxophone (tracks 1, 8)
Marc Russo – alto saxophone
Technical
Al Schmitt – engineering
Bill Schnee – mixing
Nick Knight – photography

Additionally, Rod Temperton, James McMillan, Geoff Travis, Damon Butcher, Steve Pearce, Cecil and Linda Womack and Archie Williams are thanked in the liner notes.

Charts

Certifications

References

Everything but the Girl albums
1990 albums
Albums produced by Tommy LiPuma
Atlantic Records albums